Paragylla is a genus of moths in the subfamily Arctiinae. The genus was erected by Paul Dognin in 1899.

Species
 Paragylla albovenosa Tessmann, 1928
 Paragylla amoureli Dognin, 1890
 Paragylla endophaea Dognin, 1899

References

Lithosiini
Moth genera